Serchhip is the headquarters town of Serchhip district in the Indian state of Mizoram, and also the headquarters of Serchhip Sadar subdivision.  It lies in the central part of Mizoram, and 112 km away from the State capital city of Aizawl. The district has the highest literacy all over India. The origin of the name comes from citrus trees found on top of the first hill of the then Serchhip village. The word meaning of Ser-chhip is 'citrus-on-top'. In addition to the former Serchhip village, the Town Area now included New Serchhip and Chhiahtlang villages.

History
The first settlement within Serchhip area can be traced back to Lallula, a Mizo chief, who set up a settlement at Kawlri. Lallula massacred Thlânrâwn Pawi at Zopui. After this incident, afraid of revenge from Thlânrâwn, he fled towards Artahkawn to Lunglei Zobawk. And from there, he migrated towards North, and reached Serchhip Kawlri. The second settlement at Serchhip was founded by Bengkhuaia, son of Lalpuithanga, Chief of Bâwngchâwm, a great Mizo chief. From Kawlri he made a raid on Assam valley (Alexandrapur and its attached areas) in 1871, captured Mary Winchester, a daughter of James Winchester, that led to the First Lushai Expedition in 1872.

Geography
It has an average elevation of 888 metres (2913 feet). It lies between the two very important rivers of Mat and Tuikum. River Tuikum is a public drinking water for Serchhip and River Mat is an irrigation water for Zawlpui, the rice bowl of Serchhip. The annual temperatures range from a high of 34 °C to a low of 10 °C.

Economy

Agriculture is one of the important occupation. Being situated near Mat river valley, Serchhip is the main producer of cash crops in Mizoram, famous for its cabbages and mustards.

Transport
Serchhip is connected by Pawan Hans Helicopter service from Aizawl. Serchhip is connected by road with  Silchar through National Highway 54, with Agartala through National Highway 40 & with Imphal through National Highway 150.  Taxis, Auto rickshaws and Town Buses are available public transports in Serchhip.

Demographics
According to Population Census in 2011, 64,875 of which male and female were 32,824 and 32,051 respectively. There was change of 20.45 percent in the population compared to population as per 2001. In the previous census of India 2001, Serchhip District recorded increase of 17.82 percent to its population compared to 1991. The initial provisional data suggest a density of 46 in 2011 compared to 38 of 2001. Total area under Serchhip district is of about 1,421 km2. Serchhip District population constituted 5.95 percent of total Mizoram population. In 2001 census, this figure for Serchhip District was at 6.06 percent of Mizoram population.

Serchhip town itself accommodated 20,073 people as per Statistical Handbook of Mizoram 2008.

Public Health
The most challenging public health issues in Serchhip are Malaria and Cancer. HIV infection among general public also increasing alarmingly. The basic health and nutritional supplements for Infants and Children are provided by Anganwadi workers, which have help in reduction of Infant mortality and Malnutrition among the children.

Education
Average literacy rate of Serchhip in 2011 were 98.76 compared to 95.18 of 2001. If things are looked out at gender wise, male and female literacy were 99.24 and 98.28 respectively. For 2001 census, same figures stood at 96.21 and 94.11 in Serchhip District. Total literate in Serchhip District were 55,102 of which male and female were 27,893 and 27,209 respectively. In 2001, Serchhip District had 42,582 in its total region. Serchhip College is the only centre of higher education in the town. Government Serchhip College, established on 25 August 1973 is one of the foremost colleges established in Mizoram, currently offering Arts, Science and Computer subjects. There are two higher secondary schools (including Government Higher Secondary School, Serchhip) and numbers of high schools, middle schools and elementary schools. Privately owned schools also take very important role in the development of education in Serchhip. The most important contribution on high literacy in the Town comes from Anganwadi centres.

Media
There are 7 daily newspaper published in Serchhip. 3 cable are operated within the town and its nearby villages.

Newspapers

Cable TV

Accredited Journalists

Tourism
 The district consists of number of towns and villages lying around Serchhip. Thenzawl is the second biggest town after Serchhip. It is one of the few flat areas with beautiful grassy landscape. Nearby Thenzawl is a spectacular waterfall called Vantawng Falls (meaning Heaven's reaching fall). This beautiful stepped fall is easily accessible by road, and it is a place where one can hear the calling of nature silently.

Paragliding
Paragliding is a new sport for the people of Serchhip town. Fédération Aéronautique Internationale International Paragliding Accuracy Championship was held in Serchhip for the year 2020 and has become a major attraction in Mizoram.

Vantawng Khawhthla

The most famous waterfall in Mizoram, Vantawng Falls, is about 4 km to the south of Thenzawl (sub-division) at Lau River. The height of this waterfall is roughly measured to be about 220 m. The artistic design like seven rounded storey cliff of this falls is very attractive. It was said that Vantawnga was a great swimmer who was supposed to have lived in a nearby village who could swim upwards to the falls when the volume of the water was at its peak. When the Ngawidawh people urged him to swim upwards of the falls again, a large log carried by the flood had hit him and died at the spot. As such, the falls was named after him. It was also said that the Mualţhuam sub-clan who had once settled in Mizoram believed and worshipped the spirit of this waterfall. It is about 24 km from the headquarters town of Serchhip.

Zoluti Hriatrengna Lung
Word meaning: Hratrengna - Memory; Lung - Stone.It could be presumed that Mary Winchester (ZOLUTI, as called by the Mizo people), taken as captive on 23 January 1871 by Mizo Chief Bengkhuaia of Kawlri was a root of Christianity in Mizoram. The spot, most of the writers and historians accepted to be the place where Zoluti was handed over to the British Official on 21 January 1872 is AW-A MUAL at Kawlri Tlang near Serchhip Kawnpui.In this place the Kristian Ṭhalai Pawl (Christian Youth Fellowship), Serchhip Vengchung Branch had erected a stone on 5 January 1994 in memory of Zoluti, daughter of Dr. Winchester, a manager in one of the Assam Tea Garden.However, the place was a historical agenda which had since long been debated between writers, historians and the people of Sailàm, Serchhip and Thenzawl. Till today, the question remains unsettled. There is no historical fact as to where Zolûti was handed over to the British official.The army column called The Lushai Expeditionary Force (Vailian Pahnihna) specially entrusted to bring back the white maid Zolûti was commanded by Lt. Col. T. H. Lewin, the Mizo people named him Pu Thangliana, who wrote the book A fly on the Wheel, in which he put the following lines:-
"...She (Zolûti) appeared, during her long stay with her kidnapper to have altogether forgotten English language, but on the officer fumbling in his pocket, and demanding whether she would like to have a sweet, her memory was at once refreshed and she held out her hand, showing that she understood what had been said." -(page 277, A fly on the Wheel)

Chhingpuii Thlan
Word meanings: Thlàn - Tomb; Nl - Abbv. of Nula (Unmarried woman), Tv - Tlangval (Unmarried man)Chhingchhîp Branch YMA had erected a stone in memory of Nl. Chhingpuii at about 4 km north of Chhingchhip just above the Indian National Highway No. 54.Nl. Chhíngpuii (of Ruanzáwl sub-Village) was known for her beauty. They were in deep attachment with Tv. Kaptluanga. Meanwhile, Lalnawta, son of a village council elder, also loved her, but could not win her heart and then tried to revenge upon her lover. He made the evil spirit get inside Kâptluanga and he began seriously ill and could not move out at all.Even after that a love feeling inside Chhingpuii did not fade away. When she set out to her daily routine of going to Lo (jhum or farm) also, if she went along with other bachelors, she afraid that her lover, Kaptluanga's heart would have inflamed. So, she used to set off to lo along with an old man Ralteawmkhauha.It was on that very morning that she was caught by the enemies (during that time the second most famous civil war, Chhak leh Tlang Indo, East and West War 1877 - 1880 was going on) and she died at the hands of her captors, led by Thangzika (of Tachhip Village), though she had pleaded vehemently to save her life. It is said that her beauty did not fade even after her death.

Near-by Villages
Buangpui is a village lying along the Aizawl-Lunglei via Thenzawl road.
Neihloh is another village at about 10 km from Buangpui. Zakuala Sailo used to rule in this village during the chieftainship period before the British abolished this tradition of the Mizo nation.
Hriangtlang is a village on the south south east of Serchhip containing around 100 households.

List of Associations/Society
YMA (Young Mizo Association) is the most popular group/association in mizoram, which has more than 50% of the total population in the state. This group is a nonprofit and non government which has a mass impact on the society. Its also the power house of the state. 
MZP (Mizo Zirlai Pawl) is of most the strongest association in the state, which give pressure to the government and individual on regarding any of the social imbalance and corruption and any other case of the state. 
MUP (Mizo Ûpa pawl pawl) is a group of elder people of the local community, they are the ring leader of the non government organization in the state, although its not the strongest but advisory to all the NGO's of the state. 
MHIP (Mizo Hmeichhe Insuihkhawm Pawl) is a non-goverment organization and its entirely build for women only, for the intrest of the society , especially for women. 
There are so many association in these area, mention in the above are the most common and powerful organization in the area

External links

 Serchhip Information Website
 Govt. Serchhip College
 Latest Serchhip News
 Zothlifim Daily Newspaper Serchhip

References

 
Cities and towns in Serchhip district